The Spectrum Between is the fourth album by David Grubbs, released in 2000 through Drag City.

Track listing

Personnel 
Musicians
Noël Akchoté – guitar on "Seagull and Eagull", "Whirlweek" and "Gloriette"
Dan Brown – drums, percussion
Daniel Carter – trumpet on "Stanwell Perpetual", "Preface" and "Two Shades of Green"
David Grubbs – guitar
Mats Gustafsson – saxophone on "Stanwell Perpetual" and "Gloriette"
John McEntire – drums, percussion
Charlie O. – organ on "Pink Rambler" and "Preface"
Quentin Rollet – saxophone on "Pink Rambler"
Production and additional personnel
Cosima von Bonin – cover art
Alan Douches – mastering
Justus Köhnke – cover art
Nicolas Vernhes – recording

References

External links 
 

2000 albums
David Grubbs albums
Drag City (record label) albums